Hagerstown Community College (HCC) is a public community college in Hagerstown, Maryland.  It was founded in 1946.

References

External links
 Official website

Two-year colleges in the United States
Community and junior colleges in Maryland
Universities and colleges in Washington County, Maryland
Buildings and structures in Hagerstown, Maryland
Educational institutions established in 1946
1946 establishments in Maryland
NJCAA athletics
Education in Hagerstown, Maryland